Cheeseburger in Paradise was a casual dining theme restaurant chain in the United States that operated between 2002 and 2020. The chain started in 2002 as a partnership of American musician Jimmy Buffett's company, the Orlando, Florida-based Margaritaville Holdings LLC, and OSI Restaurant Partners, with Buffett licensing the name and Outback Steakhouse operating the franchising of restaurants. After a change of ownership in 2012, most of the restaurants were closed by 2014. The last location closed in September 2020.

History
The first restaurant opened on August 19, 2002, in the Southport area of Indianapolis, Indiana. It is a theme restaurant named for the song "Cheeseburger in Paradise" by American pop music singer Jimmy Buffett. The chain was a partnership of Buffett's company, the Orlando, Florida-based Margaritaville Holdings LLC, and OSI Restaurant Partners, with Buffett licensing the name and Outback Steakhouse operating the franchising of restaurants.

In September 2009, Cheeseburger in Paradise was sold to Paradise Restaurant Group, LLC. Jimmy Buffett was only a royalty partner, receiving 2% of profits until selling Paradise Restaurant Group the rights to the song "Cheeseburger in Paradise". In December 2012, Luby's purchased Paradise Restaurant Group for $11 million, thereby acquiring all of the restaurants and ending Jimmy Buffett's association with the chain. At the time of the sale, the company had 23 locations in 14 states.

Closings
After acquisition by Luby's, a number of the chain's locations were closed. In August 2014, Luby's announced to management and employees that half of the chain's remaining restaurants would close, either immediately or in the following few weeks. Affected restaurants included those in Fort Myers, Florida; Algonquin, Illinois; Fishers, Indiana; Terre Haute, Indiana; Evansville, Indiana; Kansas City, Kansas; Middleton, Wisconsin; Sterling Heights, Michigan; and Pasadena, Maryland. Many of these locations were to be rebranded Fuddruckers Deluxe Bar and Grill, another concept owned by Luby's and a full-service version of their Fuddrucker's chain. Ultimately not all of them were, including the one in Fishers, Indiana and California, Maryland.

In August 2018, all restaurants except for the Omaha, Nebraska, and Secaucus, New Jersey, locations were closed, including the original restaurant in Indianapolis.

The Omaha location closed in early October 2018. The last remaining Cheeseburger in Paradise location was in Secaucus.

On September 8, 2020, Cheeseburger in Paradise owner Luby's, Inc. announced they plan to liquidate existing assets, including the assets of Cheeseburger in Paradise, distributing the proceeds to investors. The Secaucus location permanently closed before the end of the month.

Lahaina, Hawaii
A chain named Cheeseburger Restaurants based in Portola, California has one of their restaurants located in oceanfront Lahaina, Hawaii, also named "Cheeseburger in Paradise". This chain, which began in 1989, has no relation to Jimmy Buffett's business. Buffett sued the owners in 1997. After a four-year legal battle, a settlement was reached that allowed Laren Gartner and Edna Bayliff to keep the name at their existing restaurants in Lahaina and Waikiki but prevented them from using it at any additional locations.

See also

 Jimmy Buffett's Margaritaville
 List of hamburger restaurants
 Cheeseburger

References

External links

Restaurant chains in the United States
Defunct restaurant chains in the United States
Restaurant franchises
Theme restaurants
Defunct hamburger restaurants
Defunct restaurants in Indianapolis
Defunct restaurants in the United States
Restaurants established in 2002
2002 establishments in Indiana
Companies based in Tampa, Florida
Lahaina, Hawaii
Jimmy Buffett's Margaritaville
2009 mergers and acquisitions
2012 mergers and acquisitions
Hamburger restaurants in the United States
2020 disestablishments in the United States